Solar geoengineering, or solar radiation modification (SRM), is a type of climate engineering in which sunlight (solar radiation) would be reflected back to outer space to limit human-caused climate change. It is not a substitute for reducing greenhouse gas emissions, but would act as a temporary measure to limit warming while emissions of greenhouse gases are reduced and carbon dioxide is removed. The most studied methods of SRM are stratospheric aerosol injection and marine cloud brightening.

Solar geoengineering appears able to prevent some or much of climate change temperature increases. Climate models consistently indicate that it is capable of returning global, regional, and local temperatures and precipitation closer to pre-industrial levels. Solar geoengineering's principal advantages are the speed with which it could be deployed and become active and the reversibility of its direct climatic effects, although the latter varies depending on method, with some concerns raised over stratospheric aerosol injection.

Proposed methods of solar geoengineering may be atmospheric, terrestrial, or space-based. Stratospheric aerosol injection appears technically feasible and inexpensive in terms of direct financial costs, though still out of reach for individuals, small states, or other non-state rogue actors; it would instead be the exclusive domain of large national economies or coalitions including at least one such economy. Space-based propositions are only theoretical, being too expensive and infeasible to implement in the next few decades.

Solar geoengineering would not directly reduce carbon dioxide concentrations in the atmosphere, and thus does not address ocean acidification caused by high levels of atmospheric CO2. Solar geoengineering's excessive and/or poorly distributed use, or sudden and sustained termination, could pose serious environmental risks. Other negative impacts are possible and more research is required to thoroughly address such impacts. Governing solar geoengineering is challenging for multiple reasons, including that few countries would likely be capable of doing it alone.

Overview 
Solar geoengineering (SG) increases Earth's ability to deflect sunlight, e.g., by increasing the albedo of the atmosphere or the surface. While reducing average temperature, it would not address ocean acidification. SG is claimed to be able to take effect rapidly and inexpensively. The effects of any project disappear quickly unless sustained, making their direct effects effectively reversible. The US National Academy of Sciences, Engineering, and Medicine stated in a 2021 report: "The available research indicates that SG could reduce surface temperatures and potentially ameliorate some risks posed by climate change (e.g., to avoid crossing critical climate “tipping points”; to reduce harmful impacts of weather extremes)."

Solar geoengineering methods include:

 Stratospheric aerosol injection, in which small particles of e.g., sulfur dioxide would be injected into the upper atmosphere.
 Marine cloud brightening, which would spray fine sea water to whiten clouds and thus increase cloud reflectivity.
 Cirrus cloud thinning, which is strictly not solar geoengineering but shares many of the physical and especially governance characteristics as the other methods.

Solar geoengineering requires relatively large scale implementation in order to impact the Earth's climate. The least costly proposals are estimated at tens of billions of US dollars annually in direct deployment costs.

Means of operation 
Averaged over the year and location, the Earth's atmosphere receives 340 W/m2 of solar irradiance from the sun. Due to elevated atmospheric greenhouse gas concentrations, the net difference between the amount of sunlight absorbed by the Earth and the amount of energy radiated back to space has risen from 1.7 W/m2 in 1980, to 3.1 W/m2 in 2019. This imbalance - called radiative forcing - means that the Earth absorbs more energy than it lets off, causing global  temperatures to rise. The goal of solar geoengineering would be to reduce radiative forcing by increasing Earth's albedo (reflectivity). An increase by about 1% of the incident solar radiation would be sufficient to eliminate current radiative forcing and thereby global warming, while a 2% albedo increase would roughly halve the effect of doubling the atmospheric carbon dioxide concentration. However, because warming from greenhouse gases and cooling from solar geoengineering operate differently across latitudes and seasons, this counter-effect would be imperfect.

Potential roles 
Solar geoengineering is almost universally intended to complement, not replace, greenhouse gas emissions reduction, carbon dioxide removal (those two together are called "mitigation"), and adaptation efforts. For example, the Royal Society stated in its landmark 2009 report: "Geoengineering methods are not a substitute for climate change mitigation, and should only be considered as part of a wider package of options for addressing climate change." Such statements are very common in solar geoengineering publications. 

Solar geoengineering's speed of effect gives it two potential roles in managing risks from climate change. First, if mitigation and adaptation continue to be insufficient, and/or if climate change impacts are severe due to greater-than-expected climate sensitivity, tipping points, or vulnerability, then solar geoengineering could reduce these unexpectedly severe impacts. In this way, the knowledge to implement solar geoengineering as a backup plan would serve as a sort of risk diversification or insurance. Second, solar geoengineering could be implemented along with aggressive mitigation and adaptation in order "buy time" by slowing the rate of climate change and/or to eliminate the worst climate impacts until net negative emissions reduce atmospheric greenhouse gas concentrations. (See diagram.)

Solar geoengineering has been suggested as a means of stabilizing regional climates - such as limiting heat waves, but control over the geographical boundaries of the effect appears very difficult.

History 
The 1965 landmark report "Restoring the Quality of Our Environment" by U.S. President Lyndon B. Johnson's Science Advisory Committee warned of the harmful effects of carbon dioxide emissions from fossil fuel and mentioned "deliberately bringing about countervailing climatic changes," including "raising the albedo, or reflectivity, of the Earth." As early as 1974, Russian climatologist Mikhail Budyko suggested that if global warming ever became a serious threat, it could be countered with airplane flights in the stratosphere, burning sulfur to make aerosols that would reflect sunlight away. Along with carbon dioxide removal, solar geoengineering was discussed jointly as "geoengineering" in a 1992 climate change report from the US National Academies. The topic was essentially taboo in the climate science and policy communities until Nobel Laureate Paul Crutzen published an influential scholarly paper in 2006. Major reports by the Royal Society (2009) and the US National Academies (2015, 2021) followed. Total research funding worldwide remains modest, less than 10 million US dollars annually. Almost all research into solar geoengineering has to date consisted of computer modeling or laboratory tests, and there are calls for more research funding as the science is poorly understood. Major academic institutions, including Harvard University, have begun research into solar geoengineering, though with few outdoor tests yet run. The Degrees Initiative is a UK registered charity, established to build capacity in developing countries to evaluate solar geoengineering. The 2021 US National Academy of Sciences, Engineering, and Medicine report recommended an initial investment into solar geoengineering research of $100–$200 million over five years. In May 2022, the Climate Overshoot Commission was launched to recommend a comprehensive strategy to reduce climate risk which includes sunlight reflection methods in its policy portfolio, and will issue a final report prior to the 2023 UN Climate Change Conference.

Evidence of effectiveness and impacts 

Climate models consistently indicate that a moderate magnitude of solar geoengineering would bring important aspects of the climate - for example, average and extreme temperature, water availability, cyclone intensity - closer to their preindustrial values at a subregional resolution. (See figure.)

The Intergovernmental Panel on Climate Change (IPCC) concluded in its Sixth Assessment Report:.... SRM could offset some of the effects of increasing GHGs on global and regional climate, including the carbon and water cycles. However, there would be substantial residual or overcompensating climate change at the regional scales and seasonal time scales, and large uncertainties associated with aerosol–cloud–radiation interactions persist. The cooling caused by SRM would increase the global land and ocean CO2 sinks, but this would not stop CO2 from increasing in the atmosphere or affect the resulting ocean acidification under continued anthropogenic emissions. It is likely that abrupt water cycle changes will occur if SRM techniques are implemented rapidly. A sudden and sustained termination of SRM in a high CO2 emissions scenario would cause rapid climate change. However, a gradual phase-out of SRM combined with emission reduction and CDR would avoid these termination effects.The 2021 US National Academy of Sciences, Engineering, and Medicine report states: "The available research indicates that SG could reduce surface temperatures and potentially ameliorate some risks posed by climate change (e.g., to avoid crossing critical climate 'tipping points'; to reduce harmful impacts of weather extremes)."

Solar geoengineering would imperfectly compensate for anthropogenic climate changes. Greenhouse gases warm throughout the globe and year, whereas solar geoengineering reflects light more effectively at low latitudes and in the hemispheric summer (due to the sunlight's angle of incidence) and only during daytime. Deployment regimes could compensate for this heterogeneity by changing and optimizing injection rates by latitude and season.

In general, greenhouse gases warm the entire planet and are expected to change precipitation patterns heterogeneously, both spatially and temporally, with an overall increase in precipitation. Models indicate that solar geoengineering would compensate both of these changes but would do more effectively for temperature than for precipitation. Therefore, using solar geoengineering to fully return global mean temperature to a preindustrial level would overcorrect for precipitation changes. This has led to claims that it would dry the planet or even cause drought, but this would depend on the intensity (i.e. radiative forcing) of solar geoengineering. Furthermore, soil moisture is more important for plants than average annual precipitation. Because solar geoengineering would reduce evaporation, it more precisely compensates for changes to soil moisture than for average annual precipitation. Likewise, the intensity of tropical monsoons is increased by climate change and decreased by solar geoengineering. A net reduction in tropical monsoon intensity might manifest at moderate use of solar geoengineering, although to some degree the effect of this on humans and ecosystems would be mitigated by greater net precipitation outside of the monsoon system. This has led to claims that solar geoengineering "would disrupt the Asian and African summer monsoons," but the impact would depend on the particular implementation regime.

People are concerned about climate change largely because of its impacts on people and ecosystems. In the case of the former, agriculture is particularly important. A net increase in agricultural productivity from elevated atmospheric carbon dioxide concentrations and solar geoengineering has also been predicted by some studies due to the combination of more diffuse light and carbon dioxide's fertilization effect. Other studies suggest that solar geoengineering would have little net effect on agriculture. Understanding of solar geoengineering's effects on ecosystems remains at an early stage. Its reduction of climate change would generally help maintain ecosystems, although the resulting more diffuse incoming sunlight would favor undergrowth relative to canopy growth.

Advantages 
The target of net zero greenhouse gas emissions can be achieved through a combination of emission cuts and carbon dioxide removal, after which global warming stops, but the temperature will only go back down if we remove more carbon dioxide than we emit. Solar geoengineering on the other hand could cool the planet within months after deployment, thus can act to reduce climate risk while we cut emissions and scale up carbon dioxide removal.  Stratospheric aerosol injection is expected to have low direct financial costs of implementation, relative to the expected costs of both unabated climate change and aggressive mitigation. Finally, the direct climatic effects of solar geoengineering are reversible within short timescales.

Limitations and risks
As well as the imperfect cancellation of the climatic effect of greenhouse gases, described above, there are other significant problems with solar geoengineering.

Incomplete solution to elevated carbon dioxide concentrations 

Solar geoengineering does not remove greenhouse gases from the atmosphere and thus does not reduce other effects from these gases, such as ocean acidification. While not an argument against solar geoengineering per se, this is an argument against reliance on it to the exclusion of emissions reduction.

Uncertainty 
Most of the information on solar geoengineering comes from climate models and volcanic eruptions, which are both imperfect analogues of stratospheric aerosol injection. The climate models used in impact assessments are the same that scientists use to predict the impacts of anthropogenic climate change. Some uncertainties in these climate models (such as aerosol microphysics, stratospheric dynamics, and sub-grid scale mixing) are particularly relevant to solar geoengineering and are a target for future research. Volcanoes are an imperfect analogue as they release the material in the stratosphere in a single pulse, as opposed to sustained injection. Modelling is uncertain as little practical research has been done.

Maintenance and termination shock 
Solar geoengineering effects would be temporary, and thus long-term climate restoration would rely on long-term deployment until sufficient carbon dioxide is removed. If solar geoengineering masked significant warming, stopped abruptly, and was not resumed within a year or so, the climate would rapidly warm. Global temperatures would rapidly rise towards levels which would have existed without the use of solar geoengineering. The rapid rise in temperature might lead to more severe consequences than a gradual rise of the same magnitude. However, some scholars have argued that this termination shock appears reasonably easy to prevent because it would be in states' interest to resume any terminated deployment regime; and because infrastructure and knowledge could be made redundant and resilient, allowing states to act on this interest and gradually phase out unwanted solar geoengineering.

Some claim that solar geoengineering "would basically be impossible to stop." This is true only of a long-term deployment strategy. A short-term, temporary strategy would limit implementation to decades.

Disagreement and control 
Although climate models of solar geoengineering rely on some optimal or consistent implementation, leaders of countries and other actors may disagree as to whether, how, and to what degree solar geoengineering be used. This could result in suboptimal deployments and exacerbate international tensions.

Some observers claim that solar geoengineering is likely to be militarized or weaponized. However, weaponization is disputed because solar geoengineering would be imprecise. Regardless, the U.N. Convention on the Prohibition of Military or Any Other Hostile Use of Environmental Modification Techniques, which prohibits weaponizing solar geoengineering, came into force in 1978.

Unwanted or premature use 
There is a risk that countries may start using solar geoengineering without proper precaution or research. Solar geoengineering, at least by stratospheric aerosol injection, appears to have low direct implementation costs relative to its potential impact. This creates a different problem structure. Whereas the provision of emissions reduction and carbon dioxide removal present collective action problems (because ensuring a lower atmospheric carbon dioxide concentration is a public good), a single country or a handful of countries could implement solar geoengineering. Many countries have the financial and technical resources to undertake solar geoengineering.

David Victor suggests that solar geoengineering is within the reach of a lone "Greenfinger," a wealthy individual who takes it upon him or herself to be the "self-appointed protector of the planet". Others disagree and argue that states will insist on maintaining control of solar geoengineering.

Distribution of effects 
Both climate change and solar geoengineering would affect various groups of people differently. Some observers describe solar geoengineering as necessarily creating "winners and losers." However, models indicate that solar geoengineering at a moderate intensity would return important climatic values of almost all regions of the planet closer to preindustrial conditions. That is, if all people prefer preindustrial conditions, such a moderate use could be a Pareto improvement.

Developing countries are particularly important, as they are more vulnerable to climate change. All else equal, they therefore have the most to gain from a judicious use of solar geoengineering. Observers sometimes claim that solar geoengineering poses greater risks to developing countries. There is no evidence that the unwanted environmental impacts of solar geoengineering would be significantly greater in developing countries, although potential disruptions to tropical monsoons are a concern. But in one sense, this claim of greater risk is true for the same reason that they are more vulnerable to greenhouse gas-induced climate change: developing countries have weaker infrastructure and institutions, and their economies rely to a greater degree on agriculture. They are thus more vulnerable to all climate changes, whether from greenhouse gases or solar geoengineering.

Lessened mitigation 
The existence of solar geoengineering may reduce the political and social impetus for mitigation. This has generally been called a potential "moral hazard," although risk compensation may be a more accurate term. This concern causes many environmental groups and campaigners to be reluctant to advocate or discuss solar geoengineering. However, several public opinion surveys and focus groups have found evidence of either assertions of a desire to increase emission cuts in the face of solar geoengineering, or of no effect. Likewise, some modelling work suggests that the threat of solar geoengineering may in fact increase the likelihood of emissions reduction.

Effect on sky and clouds 
Managing solar radiation using aerosols or cloud cover would involve changing the ratio between direct and indirect solar radiation. This would affect plant life and solar energy. Visible light, useful for photosynthesis, is reduced proportionally more than is the infrared portion of the solar spectrum due to the mechanism of Mie scattering.  As a result, deployment of atmospheric solar geoengineering would reduce by at least 2-5% the growth rates of phytoplankton, trees, and crops  between now and the end of the century. Uniformly reduced net shortwave radiation would hurt solar photovoltaics by the same >2-5% because of the bandgap of silicon photovoltaics.

Proposed forms

Atmospheric

Stratospheric aerosol injection

Injecting reflective aerosols into the stratosphere is the proposed solar geoengineering method that has received the most sustained attention. The Intergovernmental Panel on Climate Change concluded that Stratospheric aerosol injection "is the most-researched SRM method, with high agreement that it could limit warming to below 1.5°C." This technique would mimic a cooling phenomenon that occurs naturally by the eruption of volcanoes. Sulfates are the most commonly proposed aerosol, since there is a natural analogue with (and evidence from) volcanic eruptions. Alternative materials such as using photophoretic particles, titanium dioxide, and diamond have been proposed. Delivery by custom aircraft appears most feasible, with artillery and balloons sometimes discussed. The annual cost of delivering a sufficient amount of sulfur to counteract expected greenhouse warming is estimated at $5 to 10 billion US dollars. This technique could give much more than 3.7 W/m2 of globally averaged negative forcing, which is sufficient to entirely offset the warming caused by a doubling of carbon dioxide.

Marine cloud brightening

Various cloud reflectivity methods have been suggested, such as that proposed by John Latham and Stephen Salter, which works by spraying seawater in the atmosphere to increase the reflectivity of clouds. The extra condensation nuclei created by the spray would change the size distribution of the drops in existing clouds to make them whiter. The sprayers would use fleets of unmanned rotor ships known as Flettner vessels to spray mist created from seawater into the air to thicken clouds and thus reflect more radiation from the Earth. The whitening effect is created by using very small cloud condensation nuclei, which whiten the clouds due to the Twomey effect.

This technique can give more than 3.7 W/m2 of globally averaged negative forcing, which is sufficient to reverse the warming effect of a doubling of atmospheric carbon dioxide concentration.

Cirrus cloud thinning 

Natural cirrus clouds are believed to have a net warming effect. These could be dispersed by the injection of various materials. This method is strictly not solar geoengineering, as it increases outgoing longwave radiation instead of decreasing incoming shortwave radiation. However, because it shares some of the physical and especially governance characteristics as the other solar geoengineering methods, it is often included.

Ocean sulfur cycle enhancement 

Enhancing the natural marine sulfur cycle by fertilizing a small portion with iron—typically considered to be a greenhouse gas remediation method—may also increase the reflection of sunlight. Such fertilization, especially in the Southern Ocean, would enhance dimethyl sulfide production and consequently cloud reflectivity. This could potentially be used as regional solar geoengineering, to slow Antarctic ice from melting. Such techniques also tend to sequester carbon, but the enhancement of cloud albedo also appears to be a likely effect.

Terrestrial

Cool roof

Painting roof materials in white or pale colors to reflect solar radiation, known as 'cool roof' technology, is encouraged by legislation in some areas (notably California). This technique is limited in its ultimate effectiveness by the constrained surface area available for treatment. This technique can give between 0.01 and 0.19 W/m2 of globally averaged negative forcing, depending on whether cities or all settlements are so treated. This is small relative to the 3.7 W/m2 of positive forcing from a doubling of atmospheric carbon dioxide. Moreover, while in small cases it can be achieved at little or no cost by simply selecting different materials, it can be costly if implemented on a larger scale. A 2009 Royal Society report states that, "the overall cost of a 'white roof method' covering an area of 1% of the land surface (about 1012 m2) would be about $300 billion/yr, making this one of the least effective and most expensive methods considered." However, it can reduce the need for air conditioning, which emits carbon dioxide and contributes to global warming.

Ocean and ice changes
Oceanic foams have also been suggested, using microscopic bubbles suspended in the upper layers of the photic zone. A less costly proposal is to simply lengthen and brighten existing ship wakes.

Arctic sea ice formation could be increased by pumping deep cooler water to the surface. Sea ice (and terrestrial) ice can be thickened by increasing albedo with silica spheres. Glaciers flowing into the sea may be stabilized by blocking the flow of warm water to the glacier. Salt water could be pumped out of the ocean and snowed onto the West Antarctic ice sheet.

Vegetation 
Reforestation in tropical areas has a cooling effect. Changes to grassland have been proposed to increase albedo. This technique can give 0.64 W/m2 of globally averaged negative forcing, which is insufficient to offset the 3.7 W/m2 of positive forcing from a doubling of carbon dioxide, but could make a minor contribution. Selecting or genetically modifying commercial crops with high albedo has been suggested. This has the advantage of being relatively simple to implement, with farmers simply switching from one variety to another. Temperate areas may experience a 1 °C cooling as a result of this technique. This technique is an example of bio-geoengineering. This technique can give 0.44 W/m2 of globally averaged negative forcing, which is insufficient to offset the 3.7 W/m2 of positive forcing from a doubling of carbon dioxide, but could make a minor contribution.

Space-based 

Space-based solar geoengineering projects are seen by most commentators and scientists as being very expensive and technically difficult, with the Royal Society suggesting that "the costs of setting in place such a space-based armada for the relatively short period that solar geoengineering may be considered applicable (decades rather than centuries) would likely make it uncompetitive with other solar geoengineering approaches."

Several authors have proposed dispersing light before it reaches the Earth by putting a very large diffraction grating (thin wire mesh) or lens in space, perhaps at the L1 point between the Earth and the Sun. Using a Fresnel lens in this manner was proposed in 1989 by J. T. Early, and a diffraction grating in 1997 by Edward Teller, Lowell Wood, and Roderick Hyde. In 2004, physicist and science fiction author Gregory Benford calculated that a concave rotating Fresnel lens 1000 kilometers across, yet only a few millimeters thick, floating in space at the  point, would reduce the solar energy reaching the Earth by approximately 0.5% to 1%. He estimated that this would cost around US$10 billion up front, and another $10 billion in supportive cost during its lifespan. One issue would be the need to counteract the effects of the solar wind moving such megastructures out of position. Mirrors orbiting around the Earth are another option.

Already in the years 1923, 1929, 1957 and 1978 the physicist Hermann Oberth another space mirror concept in his books. Its feasibility is also in question because of the many unanswered questions about the technology and the risks of influencing the climate.

In 1923, Hermann Oberth described his space mirrors with a diameter of 100 to 300 km in his book „Die Rakete zu den Planetenräumen“(The Rocket to the Planetary Spaces), which are said to consist of a grid network of individually adjustible facets.
Space mirrors in orbit around the earth, as designed by Hermann Oberth, are intended to focus sunlight on indiviual regions oft he earth’s surface or deflect it into space so that the solar radiation is weakened in a specifically controlled manner for individual regions on the earth’s surface.

It is therefore not a question oft he weakening oft he solar radiation on the entire exposed surface oft he earth, as would be the case when considering the establishment of shading areas at Lagrange point between the sun and the earth.

These giant mirrors in orbit could be used to illuminate individual cities, as a mens of protection against natural disasters, to control weather and climate, to create addional living space for tens of billions of people, Hermann Oberth writes. The fact that one could influence the trajectories of he barometric high and low pressure areas with these spatial mirrors seemed most important to Oberth.

Further publications followed, in which he took into account the technical progress achieved up to that point: 1929 „Ways to Spaceflight“, 1957 „Menschen im Weltraum. Neue Projekte für Raketen- und Raumfahrt“ (People in Space. New Projects for Rocket and Space) and 1978 „Der Weltraumspiegel“ (The Space Mirror). 
For cost reasons, Hermann Oberth’s concept envisages that the components on the moon  should be produced from lunar minerals, because ist lower gravitational pull requires less energy to launch the components into lunar orbit. In addition, the earth’s atmosphere is not burdened by many rocket launches. From the lunar surface, the components would be launched into the lunar orbit by an electromagnetic lunar slingshot and „stacked“ at a 60° libration point. From there, the components could be tranported into orbit with the electric spaceships he had designed with litle recoil, and there they would be assembled into mirrors with a diameter of 100 to 300 km.

Hermann Oberth pointed out that these mirrors could also be used as a weapon. This circumstance als well as the complexity of this project could only make these mirrors a reality as a peace project of mankind.

Governance 
Solar geoengineering poses several governance challenges because of its high leverage, low apparent direct costs, and technical feasibility as well as issues of power and jurisdiction. Solar geoengineering does require widespread engagement with community and stakeholders, not to incur in a multitude of challenges and barriers to the research, testing and deployment of novel technology. Because international law is generally consensual, this creates a challenge of participation that is the inverse of that of mitigation to reduce climate change, where widespread participation is required. Discussions are broadly on who will have control over the deployment of solar geoengineering and under what governance regime the deployment can be monitored and supervised. A governance framework for solar geoengineering must be sustainable enough to contain a multilateral commitment over a long period of time and yet be flexible as information is acquired, the techniques evolve, and interests change through time.

Legal and regulatory systems may face a significant challenge in effectively regulating solar geoengineering in a manner that allows for an acceptable result for society. Some researchers have suggested that building a global agreement on solar geoengineering deployment will be very difficult, and instead power blocs are likely to emerge. There are, however, significant incentives for states to cooperate in choosing a specific solar geoengineering policy, which make unilateral deployment a rather unlikely event.

In 2021, the National Academies of Sciences, Engineering, and Medicine released their consensus study report Recommendations for Solar Geoengineering Research and Research Governance, concluding:

Public attitudes and politics

There have been a handful of studies into attitudes to and opinions of solar geoengineering. These generally find low levels of awareness, uneasiness with the implementation of solar geoengineering, cautious support of research, and a preference for greenhouse gas emissions reduction. As is often the case with public opinions regarding emerging issues, the responses are highly sensitive to the questions' particular wording and context. Although most public opinion studies have polled residents of developed countries, those that have examined residents of developing countries—which tend to be more vulnerable to climate change impacts—find slightly greater levels of support there.

There are many controversies surrounding this topic and hence, solar geoengineering has become a very political issue. No countries have an explicit government position on solar geoengineering.

Support for solar geoengineering research comes almost entirely from those who are concerned about climate change. Some observers claim that political conservatives, opponents of action to reduce climate change, and fossil fuel firms are major advocates of solar geoengineering research. However, only a handful of conservatives and opponents of climate action have expressed support, and there is no evidence that fossil fuel firms are involved in solar geoengineering research. Instead, these claims often conflate solar geoengineering and carbon dioxide removal—where fossil fuel firms are involved—under the broader term "geoengineering."

Some environmental groups have endorsed solar geoengineering research while others are opposed.

As noted, the interests and roles of developing countries are particularly important. The Solar Radiation Management Governance Initiative works toward "expanding an informed international conversation about SRM research and its governance, and building the capacity of developing countries to evaluate this controversial technology." Among other activities, it provides grants to researchers in the Global South.

In 2021, researchers at Harvard were forced to put plans for a solar geoengineering test on hold after Indigenous Sámi people objected to the test taking place in their homeland. Although the test would not have involved any immediate atmospheric experiments, members of the Saami Council spoke out against the lack of consultation and solar geoengineering more broadly. Speaking at a panel organized by the Center for International Environmental Law and other groups, Saami Council Vice President Åsa Larsson Blind said, "This goes against our worldview that we as humans should live and adapt to nature."

See also

 Climate engineering
 Cloud seeding
 Passive daytime radiative cooling
 Weather Modification Operations and Research Board

References

Further reading
The Royal Society. "Geoengineering the Climate: Science, Governance and Uncertainty." London: The Royal Society, 2009.
Hulme, Mike. Can Science Fix Climate Change? A Case Against Climate Engineering. Cambridge, UK: Polity, 2014.
National Research Council. Climate Intervention: Reflecting Sunlight to Cool Earth. Washington: National Academies Press, 2015.
Reynolds, Jesse L. The Governance of Solar Geoengineering: Managing Climate Change in the Anthropocene. Cambridge, UK: Cambridge University Press, 2019.
Burns, Lizzie, David Keith, Joshua Horton, and Peter Irvine. Technology Factsheet: Solar Geoengineering, 2019.
Kurzgesagt. Geoengineering: A Horrible Idea We Might Have to Do, 2020.
National Academies of Sciences, Engineering, and Medicine. Reflecting Sunlight: Recommendations for Solar Geoengineering Research and Research Governance. Washington: National Academies Press, 2021.

Climate change policy
Planetary engineering
Climate engineering